The canton of Saint-Pourçain-sur-Sioule is a French administrative division in the county of Allier and region Auvergne-Rhône-Alpes. At the French canton reorganisation which came into effect in March 2015, the canton was expanded from 14 to 22 communes:
 
Bayet 
Billy
Boucé
Créchy 
Langy 
Loriges 
Louchy-Montfand 
Magnet 
Marcenat 
Montaigu-le-Blin 
Montoldre 
Montord 
Paray-sous-Briailles 
Rongères
Saint-Félix
Saint-Gérand-le-Puy
Saint-Loup
Saint-Pourçain-sur-Sioule 
Sanssat
Saulcet 
Seuillet 
Varennes-sur-Allier

References

Saint-Pourcain-sur-Sioule